Mansour Barnaoui (born September 20, 1992) is a French mixed martial artist who competes in the Lightweight division of Bellator MMA. As of March 14, 2023, he is #8 in the Bellator Lightweight Rankings.

Background
Residing nowadays in Malakoff, Hauts-de-Seine, Mansour was born in Tunis, Tunisia, immigrating to France as an infant, where he lived in difficult circumstances and sharing a small apartment with his three brothers and his mother. Faradji, friend and manager of Mansour, met Barnaoui when he lived in the same building as him and saw him squatting in the hall with friends, after they were unable to afford to register at the nearby wrestling room in Vanves. Faradji went to the town hall of Malakoff to ask for slots in a municipal hall, and after he was granted access, a few weeks later, the small band of Malakoff could finally train at the municipal gymnasium and the Magnum club was born. Aziz Mahi, Barnaoui's trainer in France, welcomed him to his gymnasium in the suburbs of Paris when he was only 14 years old. He quickly understood that he had the makings of a champion and went from grappling, to boxing, to pankration and then to train MMA

When he was younger, Barnaoui would skateboard and emulate Yamakasi parkour, earning the nickname Tarzan from the neighborhood grown-ups. Likewise, due to his immigration status, Mansour is not a French citizen due to the nature of his arrival to France. This means that all of his MMA contracts need to be signed outside of the country.

Mixed martial arts career

Early career
A longtime product of Team Magnum MMA in Paris, France, the ‘Afro-Samurai’ got his start in the hybrid-MMA promotion 100% Fight, back before full-rules mixed martial arts had been legalized in the country. A 6-0 run early in his pro career was halted by a loss to future UFC top contender Kevin Lee during Instinct MMA 4 in Canada. After rebounding with a first round TKO stoppage at SHC 7, Cage Warriors approached Barnaoui and offered him a fight against Conor McGregor. The organizers were offering the fight between the two on the condition that Mansour signed a two-year contract with them. However, Mansour chose to instead sign with M-1 Global as the promotion was offering 10,000 and 15,000 euros per fight compared to the 2000 to 3000 euros at the Cage Warriors.

A few days before his first fight for M-1 on April 9, 2013 at M-1 Challenge 38, against future UFC champion Islam Makhachev, Mansour's father died. However, he decided to still fight and lost a hard fought bout via unanimous decision.

Rebounding against Zulfikar Usmanov at M-1 Challenge 41, he submitted Usmanov via rear-naked choke in the third round. The Tunisian continued his momentum by winning a belt in another European organization, BAMMA, winning the BAMMA World Lightweight Championship  and defending it against UFC vets Curt Warburton and Colin Fletcher.

Returning to M-1, Barnaoui won the M-1 Lightweight Championship against Maxim Divnich at M-1 Challenge 57, defeating Divnich via TKO stoppage after dropping him with a knee at the end of the first round and finishing him with ground and pound. Dropping down to Featherweight for the first and only time in his career for a chance for the M-1 Featherweight Championship against Ivan Buchinger at M-1 Challenge 62, Mansour lost the bout via unanimous decision.

Konfrontacja Sztuk Walki 
On May 27, 2016 at KSW 35, he fought for the vacant KSW Lightweight Championship belt against future UFC fighter Mateusz Gamrot. He lost the bout via unanimous decision.

In his next bout for the promotion, Barnaoui faced Łukasz Chlewicki on December 3, 2016 at KSW 37. He won the bout via doctor stoppage in the first round.

Road FC 
In the International Trials, he defeated Won Bin Ki at Road FC 038 by the way of first-round rear-naked choke, earning a spot in the Road Fighting Championship's 16-man Road FC $1 Million Dollar Lightweight Tournament.

In the opening round, Barnaoui faced Chang Hyun Kim at Road FC 040 on July 15, 2017, winning by the way of first round rear-naked choke. In the quarterfinals, he faced Nandin-Erdene Munguntsooj at Road FC 044 on November 11, 2017, where earned another submission victory via rear-naked choke, this time in the second round. In the semifinals, Barnanoui faced Kota Shimoishi at Road FC 046 on March 10, 2018, where he submitted Shimoishi with a rear-naked choke in the third round to earn his way into the tournament final. In the final at Road FC 052 on February 23, 2019, Barnaoui faced Khabib's cousin, Shamil Zavurov, knocking him out with a highlight flying knee in the third round.

On May 18, 2019 at Road FC 053. Barnaoui won the $1 million dollar prize and the Road FC Lightweight Championship against A Sol Kwon, submitting Kwon in the first round via rear-naked choke.

During the next three years in the pandemic, the snowboarding enthusiast escaped to the mountains whenever he could and due to the pandemic restrictions shutting down his base camp at the Jacques-Duclos gymnasium in Malakoff, he went to train in Dubai, one of the few accessible places with open rooms. He also trained in Thailand and spent six months in Las Vegas, at the 10th Planet and Xtreme Couture, where he was able to train against many talented fighters from the top promotions.

Bellator MMA
In June 2022, Barnaoui signed an exclusive multi-fight deal with Bellator MMA.

Barnaoui made his promotional debut headlining Bellator 287 on October 29, 2022 against Adam Piccolotti. He won the bout in a very dominant fashion, finishing Piccolotti in the second round via rear-naked choke.

Lightweight Grand Prix 
On January 11, 2023, Barnaoui was announced as one of the 8 participants in the $1 million Bellator Lightweight World Grand Prix. Barnaoui was scheduled to face Sidney Outlaw on May 12, 2023, at Bellator 296. However at the end of February, Outlaw tested postive for banned substances and was suspended, resulting in him being replaced by the alternate, Brent Primus.

Championships and accomplishments
 Road Fighting Championship
 Road FC Lightweight Championship (One time)
 Road FC $1 Million Dollar Lightweight Tournament 'Road To A-Sol'
 M-1 Global
 M-1 Lightweight Championship (One time)
 BAMMA
 BAMMA World Lightweight Championship (One time)
 One successful title defense
 100% Fight
 100% Fight Lightweight Championship (One time)

Mixed martial arts record

|-
|Win
|align=center|20–4
|Adam Piccolotti
|Submission (rear-naked choke)
|Bellator 287
|
|align=center|2
|align=center|2:51
|Milan, Italy
|
|-
|Win
|align=center|19–4
|A Sol Kwon
|Submission (rear-naked choke)
|Road FC 053
|
|align=center|1
|align=center|3:44
|Jeju, South Korea
|
|-
|Win
|align=center|18–4
|Shamil Zavurov
|KO (flying knee)
|Road FC 052
|
|align=center| 3
|align=center| 0:30
|Seoul, South Korea
|
|-
|Win
|align=center|17–4
|Kota Shimoishi
|Submission (rear-naked choke)
|Road FC 046
|
|align=center|3
|align=center|1:47
|Seoul, South Korea
|
|-
|Win
|align=center|16–4
|Nandin-Erdene Munguntsooj
|Submission (rear-naked choke)
|Road FC 044
|
|align=center|2
|align=center|2:02
|Shijiazhuang, China
|
|-
|Win
|align=center|15–4
|Chang Hyun Kim
|Submission (rear-naked choke)
|Road FC 040
|
|align=center|1
|align=center|4:28
|Seoul, South Korea
|
|-
|Win
|align=center|14–4
|Won Bin Ki
|Submission (rear-naked choke)
|Road FC 038
|
|align=center|1
|align=center|4:46
|Seoul, South Korea
|
|-
|Win
|align=center|13–4
|Łukasz Chlewicki
|TKO (doctor stoppage)
|KSW 37
|
|align=center|1
|align=center|3:09
|Kraków, Poland
|
|-
|Loss
|align=center|12–4
|Mateusz Gamrot
|Decision (unanimous)
|KSW 35
|
|align=center|3
|align=center|5:00
|Gdańsk/Sopot, Poland
|
|-
|Loss
|align=center|12–3
|Ivan Buchinger
|Decision (unanimous)
|M-1 Challenge 62
|
|align=center|5
|align=center|5:00
|Sochi, Russia
|
|-
|Win
|align=center|12–2
|Maxim Divnich
|TKO (knee and punches)
|M-1 Challenge 57
|
|align=center|1
|align=center|4:47
|Orenburg, Russia
|
|-
|Win
|align=center|11–2
|Colin Fletcher
|Submission (rear-naked choke)
|BAMMA 14
|
|align=center|1
|align=center|4:00
|Birmingham, England
|
|-
|Win
|align=center|10–2
|Curt Warburton
|TKO (punches)
|BAMMA 13
|
|align=center| 1
|align=center| 4:08
|Birmingham, England
|
|-
|Win
|align=center|9–2
|Zulfikar Usmanov
|Submission (rear-naked choke)
|M-1 Challenge 41
|
|align=center|3
|align=center|4:19
|Saint Petersburg, Russia
|
|-
|Loss
|align=center|8–2
|Islam Makhachev
|Decision (unanimous)
|M-1 Challenge 38
|
|align=center| 3
|align=center| 5:00
|Saint Petersburg, Russia
|
|-
|Win
|align=center|8–1
|Ivan Musardo
|TKO (punches)
|SHC 7
|
|align=center|1
|align=center|2:03
|Geneva, Switzerland
|
|-
|Loss
|align=center|7–1
|Kevin Lee
|Decision (unanimous)
|Instinct MMA: Instinct Fighting 4
|
|align=center|3
|align=center|5:00
|Montreal, Canada
|
|-
|Win
|align=center|7–0
|Brad Wheeler
|Submission (rear-naked choke)
|Cage Warriors: Fight Night 4
|
|align=center|3
|align=center|4:26
|Dubai, United Arab Emirates
|
|-
|Win
|align=center|6–0
|Araik Margarian
|Submission (rear-naked choke)
|100% Fight 7
|
|align=center|2
|align=center|4:03
|Aubervilliers, France
|
|-
|Win
|align=center|5–0
|Yves Landu
|Decision (split)
|rowspan=2|100% Fight 5
|rowspan=2|
|align=center|3
|align=center|5:00
|rowspan=2|Paris, France
|
|-
|Win
|align=center|4–0
|Julien Boussuge
|TKO (knees)
|align=center|2
|align=center|3:51
|
|-
|Win
|align=center|3–0
|Chabane Chaibeddra
|Submission (north-south choke)
|rowspan=3|100% Fight: Contenders 10
|rowspan=3|
|align=center|2
|align=center|2:07
|rowspan=3|Paris, France
|
|-
|Win
|align=center|2–0
|Gregoire Lambert
|Submission (north-south choke)
|align=center|1
|align=center|3:25
|
|-
|Win
|align=center|1–0
|Gaetan Hurtel
|Submission (rear-naked choke)
|align=center|2
|align=center|4:00
|

See also 
 List of current Bellator MMA fighters
 List of male mixed martial artists

References

External links 
 
 

1992 births
Living people
Tunisian male mixed martial artists
French male mixed martial artists
Lightweight mixed martial artists
Bellator male fighters